Albert Luandrew (September 5, 1906March 17, 1995), known as Sunnyland Slim, was an American blues pianist who was born in the Mississippi Delta and moved to Chicago, helping to make that city a center of postwar blues. 

Chicago broadcaster and writer Studs Terkel said Sunnyland Slim was "a living piece of our folk history, gallantly and eloquently carrying on in the old tradition".

Biography
Sunnyland Slim was born on a farm in Quitman County, Mississippi, near the unincorporated settlement of Vance. He moved to Memphis, Tennessee, in 1925, where he performed with many of the popular blues musicians of the day. His stage name came from the song "Sunnyland Train", about a railroad line between Memphis and St. Louis, Missouri. In 1942 he moved to Chicago, in the great migration of southern workers to the industrial north.

At that time the electric blues was taking shape in Chicago, and through the years Sunnyland Slim played with such musicians as Muddy Waters, Howlin' Wolf, Robert Lockwood Jr., and Little Walter. His piano style is characterised by heavy basses or vamping chords with the left hand and tremolos with the right. His voice was loud, and he sang in a declamatory style.

Sunnyland Slim's first recording was as a singer with Armand "Jump" Jackson's band for Specialty Records in September 1946. His first recordings as a leader were for Hy-Tone Records and Aristocrat Records in late 1947. He continued performing until his death, in 1995.

He released one record for RCA Victor, "Illinois Central" backed with "Sweet Lucy Blues" (Victor 20–2733), under the name Dr. Clayton's Buddy.

In the late 1960s, Slim became friends with members of the band Canned Heat and played piano on the track "Turpentine Moan" on their album Boogie with Canned Heat. In turn, members of the band—lead guitarist Henry Vestine, slide guitarist Alan Wilson and bassist Larry Taylor—contributed to Sunnyland Slim's Liberty Records album Slim's Got His Thing Goin' On (1969), which also featured Mick Taylor.

He was a recipient of a 1988 National Heritage Fellowship awarded by the National Endowment for the Arts, which is the United States government's highest honor in the folk and traditional arts.

He died in March 1995 in Chicago, after complications from renal failure, at the age of 88.

Discography

NB. Sunnyland Slim recorded on many different record labels over his lengthy career.  Some of these titles were issued, and re-issued, at various dates and on other labels.

With Howlin' Wolf
Live and Cookin' (Chess, 1972)

References

External links
 
Discography, 1947–1970
Obituary from The Independent - accessed May 2009

1906 births
1995 deaths
People from Quitman County, Mississippi
American blues pianists
American male pianists
Blues musicians from Mississippi
African-American pianists
Chicago blues musicians
Delta blues musicians
National Heritage Fellowship winners
Deaths from kidney failure
20th-century American pianists
20th-century American male musicians
Black & Blue Records artists
Cobra Records artists
Earwig Music artists
Mapleshade Records artists
Southland Records artists
20th-century African-American musicians